Saccorhiza is a genus of brown algae belonging to the family Phyllariaceae.

Species:

Saccorhiza bulbosa 
Saccorhiza dermatodea 
Saccorhiza polyschides

References

Tilopteridales
Brown algae genera